Bablicon was an Elephant 6-related free-jazz band consisting of members of Neutral Milk Hotel and The Gerbils.

The band was formed in 1996 when Dave McDonnell (credited as The Diminisher), Jeremy Barnes (as "Marta Tennae"), and Griffin Rodriguez ("Blue Hawaii") teamed up to write and improvise music.  Their almost-entirely-improvised album In A Different City was recorded in Chicago during this time, and later released in 1999.  In a unique twist, the band had an audience paint vinyl LP covers while they performed, which were later collected as "painticons" and distributed as the actual album covers for the LP version of the album.

The Orange Tapered Moon EP followed in 2000, recorded during a late night marathon session at WFMU.  The LP covers were again created in the same way the In a Different City covers were.

In 2001, the band released A Flat Inside A Fog, The Cat That Was A Dog, another ambitious project.  The band split following this release, with McDonnell studying in China and starting the Michael Columbia project with drummer Dylan Ryan, Barnes going to France to work on other projects, and Rodriguez working on his Icy Demons project. Barnes now records as A Hawk and a Hacksaw.

Discography

Bablicon has released a number of albums and singles on different record labels.

Albums

 In A Different City (CD/LP) - Pickled Egg/Misra -  1999 
 A Flat Inside A Fog, The Cat That Was A Dog (CD/LP) - Pickled Egg/Misra - 2001

Singles and EPs

 "Chunks Of Syrup Amdist Plain Yoghurt" (7") - Pickled Egg/Contact - 1999 
 The Orange Tapered Moon - (12"/CD) - Pickled Egg/Misra - 2000

External links
 Elephant6.com on Bablicon.
 [ Allmusic entry].

The Elephant 6 Recording Company artists
Misra Records artists